Tears of Stone is a 1995 Icelandic drama film directed by Hilmar Oddsson. The film was selected as the Icelandic entry for the Best Foreign Language Film at the 68th Academy Awards, but was not accepted as a nominee.

Cast
 Þröstur Leó Gunnarsson as Jón
 Ruth Olafsdottir as Annie (as Ruth Ólafsdóttir)
 Ulrich Tukur as Ernst Züchner
 Hera Hilmarsdóttir as daughter of Jón
 Heinz Bennent as Annie's father
 Ingrid Andree as Annie's mother
 Winfried Wagner as Narrator

See also
 List of submissions to the 68th Academy Awards for Best Foreign Language Film
 List of Icelandic submissions for the Academy Award for Best Foreign Language Film

References

External links
 

1995 films
1995 drama films
Icelandic drama films
1990s Icelandic-language films
Films directed by Hilmar Oddsson